Heerwagen is a German surname. Notable people with the surname include:

Bernadette Heerwagen (born 1977), German actress
Philipp Heerwagen (born 1983), German footballer

German-language surnames